Henry Alvey (died 1627) was a Fellow, and later President, of St John's College, Cambridge, Provost of Trinity College Dublin from 1601 to 1609 and Vice-Chancellor of the University of Dublin from 1609 to 1612. To St. John's, Alvey bequeathed a number of his own books as well as 100 marks for purchasing books.

See also
Richard Alvey (priest)

References

Year of birth missing
1627 deaths
Alumni of St John's College, Cambridge
English Puritans
Fellows of St John's College, Cambridge
Provosts of Trinity College Dublin